The Leinster colleges senior football "A" championship, is the top level Gaelic football competition for secondary schools in Leinster. The winners receive the Brother Bosco (Mulhare) Cup and advance to the All-Ireland colleges "A" senior football championship, where they compete for the Hogan Cup.

St Mel's College of Longford hold the record for number of wins and this includes a record of six title wins in a row and a total of eight in the same decade. They also reached fourteen straight finals between 1930 and 1943. Naas CBS are the current title holders.

Wins listed by college

Finals listed by year

 Teams in bold went on to win the Hogan Cup in the same year.

See also
 Hogan Cup
 Connacht Championship
 Corn Uí Mhuirí (Munster Championship)
 MacRory Cup (Ulster Championship)
 Hurling Championship

Sources

References

Gaelic football competitions in Leinster